Upper Boddington is a village situated in West Northamptonshire, England.  It is in the parish of Boddington  along with the smaller village of Lower Boddington.

The village is located approximately 10 miles from Daventry, 12 miles from Banbury and 16 miles from Leamington Spa. Its far enough away from urban areas to maintain a rural village character, but close enough so that commuters have easy access to the M1 and M40 motorways .

The village's name means 'hill of Bota'.

The village has a number of community facilities and businesses that serve the local area: the Church of England Primary School, post office, the Plough Inn pub, a newly constructed village hall situated next to the playing fields, and Upper Boddington church. Upper Boddington is also home to successful motor racing team, Team GCR which in 2009 fielded a car in the FIA European GT4 Championship.

Local activities range from darts and skittles leagues at the Plough Inn, badminton matches and yoga classes at the village hall, a six-a-side football team playing in Napton and a classic car get-together every first Sunday of the month at the Village Garage. There is also a brand new cycle park in the village park.

References

Villages in Northamptonshire
West Northamptonshire District